This is a List of Montenegro national rugby unit players.

As of 1 May 2018 there have been 46 rugby players that have represented Montenegro in rugby union. This is the list of every player that has gotten an official cap while playing in an official tournament or test match. (Does not include friendlies played)

List of Montenegro National Rugby Players

 the star shows that they have played for the national seven's team and bold means they have captained the team

References
1. https://web.archive.org/web/20160705080340/http://www.rugbyeurope.eu/upload/file/1463604483_160518%20ENC3%20ET%20MG%20game%20sheet.PDF

2. https://web.archive.org/web/20160705075238/http://www.rugbyeurope.eu/upload/file/1463864165_160521%20ENC3%20BR%20MG%20Game%20sheet.PDF

3. https://www.facebook.com/montenegrorugby/photos/a.140704846035521.23959.140690896036916/862180837221248/?type=3&theater

4. https://www.facebook.com/montenegrorugby/photos/a.140704846035521.23959.140690896036916/863821730390492/?type=3&theater

5. https://www.facebook.com/montenegrorugby/photos/a.389059347866735.1073741824.140690896036916/676056679166999/?type=3&theater

6. Current Men's National Rugby Union Team - the national men's rugby union team.

7. http://www.rugbyeurope.eu/rugby-europe-international-championships-m3-montenegro-vs-slovakia

8. http://www.rugbyeurope.eu/2018-rugby-europe-international-championships-m3-turkey-vs-montenegro

Rugby union in Montenegro
Lists of Montenegrin people
Montenegro